The cornett, cornetto, or zink is an early wind instrument.

Cornett may also refer to:

Cornett (surname)
Cornett, Herefordshire, hamlet in Herefordshire, England
 Cornette, a historical military term (spelled cornett), from the French language for a "small cavalry unit", its guidon, or its lowest ranking officer, the cornet

See also
Cornet (disambiguation)
Cornetto (disambiguation)
Cornette (disambiguation)